Charles Askegard is an American ballet dancer and ballet master at Pennsylvania Ballet.

Early life and education 
Askegard was born in Minneapolis, Minnesota, and began his dance training at the age of five with Loyce Houlton and the Minnesota Dance Theatre. He continued his studies in Minneapolis until the age of 16, spending one summer at the School of American Ballet.

Career 
Askegard joined American Ballet Theatre as a member of the corps de ballet in 1987, and was promoted to soloist in 1992. In 1997, he left ABT to join New York City Ballet as a soloist and was promoted to principal the next year.

Askegard appeared in PBS' Live from Lincoln Center broadcast, "New York City Ballet's Diamond Project: Ten Years of New Choreography" in 2002, dancing in Them Twos and two years later in the Live From Lincoln Center broadcast, "Lincoln Center Celebrates Balanchine 100," in Vienna Waltzes. He has been a guest artist with Pacific Northwest Ballet, Ballet Etudes of South Florida, Bayerisches Staatsballett, Philippine Ballet Theatre, The Daring Project and Stars of American Ballet. He also appeared in Fred Wiseman's documentary Ballet.

Askegard danced his farewell performance the last day of the fall 2011 season, Sunday, October 9; the program consisted of the Diamonds pas de deux from Jewels, Episodes, In Memory of ... and Western Symphony. He will be forming his own ballet company, Ballet Next, with former ABT principal dancer Michele Wiles.<ref>Backstage Charles Askegard and Michele Wiles Talk About Their New Ballet Company, Lisa Jo Sagolla, November 24, 2011</ref>

 Personal life 

Askegard was married to author Candace Bushnell from 2002 to 2012.

 Repertory 

 Created roles 
 

 Peter Martins 
 Harmonielehre River of Light Swan Lake Them Twos Thou Swell Viva Verdi Eliot Feld 
 Organon Robert La Fosse 
 Duke! Helgi Tomasson 
 Prism, Diamond Project, 2000

 Christopher Wheeldon 
 Carnival of the Animals Featured roles 
 

 George Balanchine 
 Allegro Brillante Apollo Brahms-Schoenberg Quartet Concerto Barocco Coppélia Cortège Hongrois Firebird The Four Temperaments Jewels: Diamonds
 Ivesiana Kammermusik No. 2 Liebeslieder Walzer A Midsummer Night's Dream Monumentum pro Gesualdo Movements for Piano and Orchestra The Nutcracker Orpheus Robert Schumann's Davidsbündlertänze Scotch Symphony Serenade Stars and Stripes Stravinsky Violin Concerto Swan Lake Symphony in C Tschaikovsky Pas de Deux Tschaikovsky Piano Concerto No. 2 Tschaikovsky Suite No. 3 Union Jack Vienna Waltzes Walpurgisnacht Ballet Western Symphony Who Cares? Jerome Robbins 
 The Four Seasons Glass Pieces In Memory of ... In the Night Ives, Songs Peter Martins 
 Barber Violin Concerto Fearful Symmetries Morgen Naïve and Sentimental Music The Sleeping Beauty The Waltz Project Eliot Feld 
 Intermezzo No. 1 The Unanswered Question''

References

External links 
 
 
 San Francisco Chronicle, Jocelyn Noveck, Associated Press, October 10, 2011
 Time Out New York, Gia Kourlas, October 20 – November 19, 2011
 Grand Rapids Press, Jeffrey Kaczmarczyk, September 16, 2011

New York City Ballet principal dancers
American male ballet dancers
People from Minneapolis
Year of birth missing (living people)
School of American Ballet alumni
Living people